The Noida Sector 16 is a metro station on the Blue Line of the Delhi Metro railway, in the city of Noida in Uttar Pradesh, India.

Station layout

Facilities
ATMs and parking.

Nearby
Domino's Pizza
Punjab National Bank
Indian Post

See also
List of Delhi Metro stations
Transport in Delhi
Delhi Metro Rail Corporation
Delhi Suburban Railway
List of rapid transit systems in India

References

External links
 Delhi Metro Rail Corporation Ltd. (Official site) 
 Delhi Metro Annual Reports
 
 UrbanRail.Net – descriptions of all metro systems in the world, each with a schematic map showing all stations.

Delhi Metro stations
Railway stations opened in 2009
Railway stations in Gautam Buddh Nagar district
Transport in Noida